Jackie DeShannon (born Sharon Lee Myers, August 21, 1941) is an American singer-songwriter and radio broadcaster with a string of hit song credits from the 1960s onwards, as both singer and composer. She was one of the first female singer-songwriters of the rock and roll period. She is best known as the singer of "What the World Needs Now Is Love" and "Put a Little Love in Your Heart", and as the writer of "When You Walk in the Room" and "Bette Davis Eyes", which became hits for The Searchers and Kim Carnes, respectively

Since 2009 DeShannon has been an entertainment broadcast correspondent reporting Beatles band members' news for the radio program Breakfast with the Beatles.

Early life and education
DeShannon was born in Hazel, Kentucky, the daughter of parents who were farmers and musically inclined, James Erwin Myers and Sandra Jeanne (née Laporte). By age six, Sharon Myers was singing country tunes on a local radio show. By the age of 11, she was hosting her own radio program. After life on the farm became too difficult, the family moved to her mother's hometown of Aurora, Illinois and her father resumed his original career as a barber.

After a year they moved to Batavia, Illinois. She attended high school there. In May 1955 while in 8th grade, Sharon Myers, then 13 years old, was featured in the local newspaper for her vocal talents and personal appearances at community gatherings, the local hospitals, and for assorted organizations. According to the Batavia Herald, she had her own Saturday morning radio show Breakfast Melodies on radio station WMRO. Further: 
Though only 13, the youngster can boast almost 11 years of voice training and experience and in the past she has toured most of the south making personal appearances. Also she has sung on radio with a rhythm band for 2 years and has appeared on television 3 times.

In March 1956, "Sherry Lee Myers" made "another guest appearance on Pee Wee King's popular Country and Western Television Show" on Saturday evening, March 3, on Channel 2—the CBS network affiliate in Chicago. According to the Batavia Herald:Sherry Lee is a busy young lady. Each Saturday morning at 9:30 she is on the WMRO radio show. She had made appearances with the Pee Wee King Show at Ottawa, Rockford and LaSalle in recent weeks. Following her television appearance this Saturday night, the young Batavia artist will appear at the West Aurora Junior High School auditorium on Sunday, March 4th for three shows, 2, 4, and 8 pm.

She attended Batavia High School for two years (1955–1957), leaving school after her second year.

Early career
She began to record under various names such as Sherry Lee, Jackie Dee, and Jackie Shannon, with mixed success. Billboard noted (June 10, 1957) that Sherry Lee Myers, "16-year-old C&W singer of Batavia, Illinois," had recently signed to George Goldner's Gone label in New York as a rockabilly artist, and that her "handlers" (Irving Schacht and Paul Kallett) had changed her name to Jackie Dee. Her only release on Gone included "I'll Be True" (A) and "How Wrong I Was" (B), which appeared in both 78 rpm and 45 rpm versions. Myers almost certainly sang these songs at the Uptown Theater in Philadelphia on July 3, 1957, and at the Paramount Theater in New York, two weeks later, with Alan Freed's Big Rock 'n' Roll Show.

However her interpretations of country songs "Buddy" (as Jackie Dee) and "Trouble" (as Jackie Shannon) gained the attention of rock and roll star Eddie Cochran, who arranged for her to travel to California to meet his girlfriend, singer-songwriter Sharon Sheeley, who formed a writing partnership with DeShannon in 1960. Their partnership produced Brenda Lee's hits "Dum Dum" and "Heart in Hand".

In 1960, DeShannon signed with Liberty Records, adopting the name Jackie DeShannon, believed to be the name of an Irish ancestor, after executives at Liberty thought the name Sharon Myers would not help sell records. In a Fresh Air interview (June 14, 2010), DeShannon said that she chose "Jackie" as a cross-gender name. Since she had a low singing voice, she could be heard as either male or female. When she found that "Jackie Dee" was too similar to Brenda Lee, Sandra Dee, et al., she changed it to Jackie Dee Shannon, which people heard as DeShannon. The name stuck.

Using her new name as a performer, she made the WLS Chicago radio survey with the single "Lonely Girl" in late 1960. A string of mostly flop singles followed, although "The Prince" bubbled under at No. 108 in the United States in early 1962, and "Faded Love" became her first US Billboard Top 100 entry, squeaking in at No. 97 in February 1963.

She fared better with the Sonny Bono-Jack Nitzsche song "Needles and Pins" and the self-penned "When You Walk in the Room" later in 1963.  Both reached the lower rungs of the US pop charts, but were Top 40 hits in Canada, where "Needles and Pins" made it all the way to No. 1. "Needles and Pins" and "When You Walk in the Room" later became US and UK hits for The Searchers. A version of "When You Walk in the Room" by Pam Tillis topped the country charts in 1994, and the song was also recorded by ex-Byrds member Chris Hillman in 1998 and by ex-ABBA vocalist Agnetha Fältskog in 2004.

DeShannon recorded many other singles that encompassed teen pop, country ballads, rockabilly, gospel, and Ray Charles-style soul that didn't fare as well on the charts. During these years it was her songwriting and public profile rather than her recording career that kept her contracted to Liberty. DeShannon dated Elvis Presley and formed friendships with The Everly Brothers and Ricky Nelson. She also co-starred and sang with Bobby Vinton in the 1964 teen surf movie Surf Party.

DeShannon's biggest break came in February 1964 when she supported The Beatles on their first US tour, and formed a touring band with guitarist Ry Cooder. DeShannon co-wrote "Breakaway" with Sharon Sheeley, which was recorded by Irma Thomas in 1964, and by Tracey Ullman in 1983. She also wrote "Don't Doubt Yourself Babe" for Mr. Tambourine Man, the 1965 debut album of The Byrds. Her music at this stage was heavily influenced by the American West Coast sounds and folk music. Staying briefly in England in 1965, DeShannon formed a songwriting partnership with Jimmy Page, which resulted in the songs "Dream Boy" and "Don't Turn Your Back on Me". DeShannon also wrote material for singer Marianne Faithfull, including her Top Ten UK and US hit "Come and Stay With Me", which became Faithfull's biggest UK hit, peaking at No. 4 in 1965.  That same year, Cher recorded the song on her solo debut album All I Really Want to Do.  It would be three more years before Jackie DeShannon would record the song for herself, on her Laurel Canyon album in 1968. She also appeared on the television show Ready Steady Go!

Hit love songs
Moving to New York City, DeShannon co-wrote with Randy Newman, producing such songs as "She Don't Understand Him Like I Do" and "Did He Call Today Mama?", as well as writing "You Have No Choice" for Delaney Bramlett. In March 1965, DeShannon recorded Burt Bacharach and Hal David's "What the World Needs Now Is Love", which led to club tours and regular appearances on television and went to No. 7 on the US charts and No. 1 in Canada. (DeShannon's recording of the song was later used in the 1969 film Bob & Carol & Ted & Alice). She appeared in the 1967 film C'mon, Let's Live a Little, with Bobby Vee, as a folk singer.

DeShannon continued writing and recording, but it was not until 1969 that she scored her next smash single and album, both entitled "Put a Little Love in Your Heart". The self-penned single (co-written with her brother, Randy Myers and Jimmy Holiday) sold over one million copies, and was awarded a gold disc. "Put a Little Love in Your Heart" was performed as the closing number at the Music for UNICEF Concert, broadcast worldwide from the United Nations General Assembly in 1979, and was covered in 1988 as a duet by Annie Lennox and Al Green (reaching No. 9 in the Billboard Hot 100), and by Dolly Parton in 1993. The single "Love Will Find a Way" from the same album was also a moderate hit.

Later career
Switching to Atlantic Records in 1970 and moving to Los Angeles, DeShannon recorded the critically acclaimed albums Jackie (1972) and Your Baby Is a Lady (1974), but they failed to produce the same commercial success as her previous releases. In 1973, she was invited by Van Morrison to sing on his album Hard Nose the Highway (singing backup on both the title track and "Warm Love").
In 1974, DeShannon released New Arrangement for Columbia Records. She co-wrote four songs on the album with Donna Weiss, including "Queen of the Rodeo" and "Bette Davis Eyes". The latter went on to become a worldwide No. 1 single for Kim Carnes in 1981, earning Weiss and DeShannon the 1982 Grammy Award for Song of the Year. She released You're the Only Dancer in 1977, and a single from that album, "Don't Let The Flame Burn Out", was a minor hit, reaching No. 65 in the Billboard Hot 100.

DeShannon continued to record. She released You Know Me, an album of original songs, for Varèse Sarabande in 2000, and When You Walk in the Room, a new recording of her best-known songs, in 2011. She was portrayed by singer Liz Phair in an episode of American Dreams. On June 17, 2010, DeShannon was inducted into the Songwriters Hall of Fame. In 2012 she wrote and recorded "For Africa, In Africa", a song inspired by the urgent need for action to provide clean water for the African Continent. Using her continuing access and friendship with Paul McCartney and Ringo Starr, DeShannon has appeared as a contributing entertainment broadcast correspondent reporting historical anecdotes and current touring and personal news and publicity pertaining to the two surviving Beatles for Breakfast with the Beatles on Sirius XM Satellite Radio on the weekends since October 2009.

Personal life
She has a brother, Randy James Myers and sometimes has written songs with him. In the mid 1960s, she was a companion of Jimmy Page and dated Love guitarist Bryan MacLean. It is likely that Page wrote the song "Tangerine" (which appeared on the third Led Zeppelin album) after the breakup of his relationship with DeShannon in early 1965.

Her first husband was Liberty Records executive Irving "Bud" Dain, whom she married on January 29, 1966 (it was annulled in 1967). DeShannon has been married to singer-songwriter and film composer Randy Edelman since 1976. They have a son, Noah who was born in 1978.

Discography

Albums
 Jackie DeShannon (1963)
Breakin' It Up on the Beatles Tour (1964)
 Don't Turn Your Back on Me (1964)
 Surf Party (1964, soundtrack)
 This Is Jackie DeShannon (1965)
 In the Wind (1965)
 You Won't Forget Me (1965, compilation)
 C'mon, Let's Live a Little (1966, soundtrack)
 Are You Ready for This? (1966)
 New Image (1967)
 For You (1967)
 Me About You (1968)
 What the World Needs Now Is Love (1968, compilation)
 Lonely Girl (1968, compilation)
 Great Performances (1968, compilation)
 Laurel Canyon (1969)
 Put a Little Love in Your Heart (1969) US Billboard # 81
 To Be Free (1970)
 Songs (1971)
 Jackie (1972) US Billboard # 196
 Your Baby Is a Lady (1974)
 New Arrangement (1975)
 The Very Best of Jackie DeShannon (1975, compilation)
 You're the Only Dancer (1977) US Billboard # 203
 Quick Touches (1978)
 Together (1980, soundtrack)
 Pop Princess (1981, compilation)
 Jackie DeShannon (1985, compilation)
 What the World Needs Now Is ...: The Definitive Collection (1994, compilation)
 Good as Gold! (1990, compilation)
 The Best of Jackie DeShannon (1991, compilation)
 Trouble with Jackie Dee (1991)
 The Early Years (1998, compilation)
 Come and Get Me: Best of... 1958–1980 (2000, compilation)
 You Know Me (2000)
 High Coinage: The Songwriters Collection 1960–1984 (2007, compilation)
 You Won't Forget Me: The Complete Liberty Singles Volume 1 (2009, UK compilation)
 Come and Get Me: The Complete Liberty and Imperial Singles Volume 2 (2011, UK compilation)
 When You Walk in the Room (2011, songs newly recorded)
 Keep Me in Mind: The Complete Imperial and Liberty Singles, Volume 3 (2012, UK compilation)
 All the Love: The Lost Atlantic Recordings (2015, previously unreleased 1971 album)
 Stone Cold Soul: The Complete Capitol Recordings (2018, compilation)

Singles
Images of each record from 1956 to 1960, including additional liner notes, are found at "Sweet Sherry: The Early Recording Career of Jackie DeShannon" by Pete Lerner.

Film appearances
 Surf Party (1963)
 Intimacy (1966)
 C'mon Let's Live a Little (1967)

TV appearances
 Hollywood A Go Go (1965)
 Hullabaloo (1965)
 My Three Sons (1967)
 Playboy After Dark (1969)
 The Wild Wild West (1969) (The Night of the Janus)
 The Johnny Cash Show (1970)
 Flip Wilson Show (1970)
 The Virginian (1970)
 The Catcher (1972)
 The Midnight Special (1976)
 Later... with Jools Holland, Series 41, Episode 6, BBC TWO (2012)

References

External links

 Official website
 Jackie DeShannon at the Internet Movie Database
 "Sweet Sherry: The Early Recording Career of Jackie DeShannon" by Pete Lerner

1941 births
20th-century American women singers
20th-century American singers
21st-century American women singers
21st-century American singers
American folk rock musicians
American pop rock singers
American rock songwriters
American rockabilly musicians
American women rock singers
American women singer-songwriters
Country musicians from Illinois
Country musicians from Kentucky
Grammy Award winners
Imperial Records artists
Kentucky women musicians
Singers from Kentucky
Liberty Records artists
Living people
People from Aurora, Illinois
People from Batavia, Illinois
People from Calloway County, Kentucky
Rock musicians from Kentucky
Singer-songwriters from Illinois
Singer-songwriters from Kentucky